The following is a list of unproduced George A. Romero projects in roughly chronological order. During a career that spanned several decades, American film director George A. Romero had worked on a number of projects which never progressed beyond the pre-production stage under his direction. Some of these projects fell into development hell or were produced after he left production.

The Stand 
In the late 1970s, after finishing work on the horror film Martin, Romero met with horror author Stephen King to discuss possible film adaptations of his works. The first book the two decided to adapt was the apocalyptic horror novel The Stand, which was published in 1978. The two worked on a script that measured over 200 pages, with the goal for the movie to have an R rating. The project was temporarily shelved as King and Romero worked on the film Creepshow, which was released in 1982. After Creepshow, Romero left Laurel Entertainment, a company he had cofounded, and in his absence, other cofounder and film producer Richard P. Rubinstein moved forward with an adaptation of The Stand without Romero's involvement. The novel was ultimately adapted into a television miniseries directed by Mick Garris that aired on ABC in 1994.

'Salem's Lot 
Romero was initially in discussions for a film adaptation of King's novel 'Salem's Lot, which had been published in 1975. However, Romero left the project after he found out that it would be for a television miniseries and not a feature film. Tobe Hooper replaced Romero as the director for the project, and the miniseries adaptation aired in 1979.

Copperhead 
In the early 1980s, Romero was attached to direct a feature film adaptation of the Marvel Comics character Copperhead. At the time, it was planned to be the first film adaptation of a Marvel Comics property. However, the project was ultimately cancelled due to a lack of funds from Marvel. Romero would go on to work on other projects, while the first Marvel Comics film adaptation would be Howard the Duck, released in 1986.

Pet Sematary 
In 1984, author Stephen King made an agreement with Romero, his friend and collaborator at the time, to let him direct a film adaptation of his 1983 novel Pet Sematary, under the conditions that King would write the script and that the film would be shot in King's home state of Maine. Romero agreed, but the project went undeveloped for several years as many film studios were hesitant to greenlight another King adaptation after many of his works had been adapted in the early 1980s. However, during the 1988 Writers Guild of America strike, studios expressed renewed interest in Pet Sematary and the rights were acquired by Paramount Pictures. While King still intended for Romero to direct, Romero was busy doing reshoots for the Orion Pictures' film Monkey Shines, and instead the role of director for Pet Sematary went to Mary Lambert.

The War of the Worlds 
In 1986, Romero began work on a film adaptation of H. G. Wells' novel The War of the Worlds. The film was set to be produced by Paramount Pictures and was tentatively scheduled to be released in 1987. However, Paramount ultimately abandoned the idea of a motion picture and instead intended for a television program before cancelling the project entirely.

It 
Romero was initially attached to direct a miniseries adaptation for ABC of the Stephen King book It, which was published in 1986. Romero worked with screenwriter Lawrence D. Cohen on a script and consulted with special effects teams for the project, which was planned to be a ten-hour miniseries that would air over the course of five nights. However, executives at ABC were concerned that Romero would make the project too gruesome for network television, and the length of the miniseries was decreased to only four hours over the course of two nights. Unhappy with the network's involvement and with a scheduling conflict over his work on the 1990 remake of Night of the Living Dead, Romero left the project. Tommy Lee Wallace was hired as his replacement, and the miniseries aired in 1990.

The Mummy 
In the 1990s, Universal Pictures was seeking to create a remake of The Mummy, which was released in 1932. Through the early 1990s, the studio had several directors attached to the project, including Clive Barker and Joe Dante, but their proposals were passed over. In 1994, Romero wrote a draft for the film that Universal turned down for being too dark. Ultimately, Stephen Sommers was attached as director, and the remake was released in 1999.

Welcome to Dead House 
In 2019, the George A. Romero Archival Collection was acquired by the University of Pittsburgh Library System. In 2021, the library system discovered a screenplay that had been written by Romero that was an adaptation of Welcome to Dead House, the first book in the Goosebumps series by author R. L. Stine, which was published in 1992. Additionally, the archives contained a September 1995 letter from Romero to Kevin Bannerman, a vice president of 20th Century Fox's Fox Family division, which stated that Romero was under consideration for the Goosebumps project. The screenplay, which measured 124 pages, roughly follows the same plot as the book, wherein an unsuspecting family more to a new town and discover that their neighbors are undead. However, the screenplay adds some criticism of capitalism that is not present in the source material and changes some elements of the plot. Romero was one of several filmmakers who expressed interest in adapting Goosebumps during the height of its popularity in the 1990s, and Tim Burton was at one point attached to a project but abandoned it to work on Superman Lives. Romero's screenplay ultimately went undeveloped, and it would take until 2015 that Goosebumps received a film adaptation without Romero's involvement.

Resident Evil 
In 1998, video game publisher Capcom hired Romero to direct a live-action television advertisement for their zombie survival horror video game Resident Evil 2 that aired only in Japan, where the game was known as Biohazard 2. The advertisement impressed executives at Sony Pictures, who reached out to Romero to direct a live-action film adaptation of Resident Evil. Romero was regarded as having created the zombie genre with his film Night of the Living Dead, and Shinji Mikami, the designer of Resident Evil, was a fan of Romero's zombie films. Romero completed a draft within six weeks that was largely faithful to the plot of the game, focusing on the characters of Chris Redfield and Jill Valentine and set in Spencer Mansion. However, Capcom and Sony passed on Romero's script, with Capcom producer Yoshiki Okamoto saying, "Romero's script wasn't good, so Romero was fired". Ultimately, British filmmaker Paul W. S. Anderson would helm a film adaptation of Resident Evil that was released in 2002 with a plot that differed substantially from the game and Romero's original script. The movie is credited with reviving interest in the zombie genre, and Romero would go on to direct three other zombie movies in the 2000s.

The Girl Who Loved Tom Gordon 
In the early 2000s, Romero became involved in adapting The Girl Who Loved Tom Gordon, a 1999 novel by Stephen King, with whom Romero had previously worked on the films Creepshow and The Dark Half. However, the project stalled and was not revived by the time of Romero's death in 2017. In 2019, the project was revived with the involvement of Chris Romero, George's widow.

From a Buick 8 
In 2005, Romero announced that he was working on adapting the Stephen King novel From a Buick 8, which was published in 2002. A script was written by Richard Chizmar and Johnathon Schaech and would be produced by start-up film studio Chesapeake Films. However, the studio was unable to get financing for the film and Romero was eventually replaced by Hooper. As of 2022, the film is in development hell.

References

Further reading 

 
 
 

Lists of unrealized projects by artist